Daniela Galassi (born 25 June 1968) is a Sammarinese swimmer. She competed in three events at the 1984 Summer Olympics.

References

1968 births
Living people
Sammarinese female swimmers
Olympic swimmers of San Marino
Swimmers at the 1984 Summer Olympics
Place of birth missing (living people)